Mataré is a surname. Notable people with the surname include:

 Ewald Mataré (1887–1965), German painter and sculptor 
 Herbert Mataré (1912–2011), German physicist